1997–98 Second League of FR Yugoslavia (Serbian: Druga liga SR Jugoslavije 1997/98) consisted of two groups of 18 teams.

League table

East

West

References

External links
 Match Reports: Round 19
 Match Reports: Round 20
 Match Reports: Round 28
 Match Reports: Round 29
 Match Reports: Round 30
 Match Reports: Round 31
 Match Reports: Round 32
 Match Reports: Round 33
 Match Reports: Round 34

Yugoslav Second League seasons
Yugo
2